Dyschirius unipunctatus is a species of ground beetle in the subfamily Scaritinae. It was described by Fall in 1901.

References

unipunctatus
Beetles described in 1901